Indirect presidential elections were held in Trinidad and Tobago on 11 February 2008. 

The incumbent George Maxwell Richards was expected to be reelected after being approved as the only nominee by 15 MPs on 4 February 2008. 

The election was held through an electoral college consisting of a joint sitting of the two houses of parliament consisting of 73 representatives, and Richards was reelected as expected.

The Opposition party nominated no candidate, in part as a protest to a foregone conclusion of the result and a boycott of the process.

References

2008 elections in the Caribbean
2008
Election, Presidential
Uncontested elections